Burnt Fort is an extinct town in Camden County, in the U.S. state of Georgia. The GNIS classifies it as a populated place.

History
A post office called Burnt Fort was in operation from 1908 until 1917. According to tradition, the community was named for an 18th-century fort which stood near the site until it burned to the ground. A variant name is "Burntfort".

References

Geography of Camden County, Georgia
Ghost towns in Georgia (U.S. state)